Bussnang railway station is a railway station in the municipality of Bussnang, in the Swiss canton of Thurgau. It is an intermediate stop on the standard gauge Wil–Kreuzlingen line of THURBO.

Services 
The following services stop at Bussnang:

 St. Gallen S-Bahn : half-hourly service from Wil to Romanshorn.

References

External links 
 
 

Railway stations in the canton of Thurgau
THURBO stations